Bob Rickenbach (born December 31, 1950) is a retired gridiron football player who played for the Ottawa Rough Riders, Philadelphia Bell and Southern California Sun. He played college football at Penn State University.

References

1950 births
Living people
Ottawa Rough Riders players
Players of American football from Philadelphia
Players of Canadian football from Philadelphia
American football offensive guards
Philadelphia Bell players
Southern California Sun players
Penn State Nittany Lions football players